Susann B. Winter, also known as Susanne Winter and Susan B Winter, is a minor German actress. She has appeared in supporting roles on German television programs before moving on to softcore erotic films such as The Tigress in the 1980s. She appeared in the long-running German police series SOKO 5113. In 2005, she appeared on the popular talk show Gottschalk & Friends.

In October 1984, Winter appeared nude in the German edition of Playboy.

References

External links 
 
 Susanne B. Winter at Deutsche Filme (German)

German film actresses
Living people
German television actresses
20th-century German actresses
21st-century German actresses
Year of birth missing (living people)